"Keep On Movin'" is a song by British boy band Five. It was released on 25 October 1999 as the second single from their second studio album, Invincible (1999), and debuted at number one on the UK Singles Chart, becoming Five's first UK number-one single. "Keep On Movin'" was the 36th-biggest-selling single of 1999 in the UK, and it received a platinum certification from the British Phonographic Industry (BPI) for sales and streams exceeding 600,000. "Keep On Movin'" also charted within the top 10 in several other countries, including Hungary, where it reached number one.

Track listings

UK and Australian CD1
 "Keep On Movin'"
 "Inspector Gadget"
 Enhanced CD

UK and Australian CD2
 "Keep On Movin'"
 "How Do Ya Feel" (Biffco remix)
 "Reminiscing"

UK cassette single and European CD single
 "Keep On Movin'"
 "Inspector Gadget"

European maxi-CD single
 "Keep On Movin'"
 "How Do Ya Feel"
 "Reminiscing"
 "Inspector Gadget"
 Enhanced CD

Credits and personnel
Credits are taken from the UK CD1 liner notes.

Studios
 Recorded at Windmill Lane Studios (Dublin, Ireland)
 Additional production and mixing at Rokstone Studios (London, England)

Personnel

 Richard Stannard – writing, production
 Julian Gallagher – writing, production
 Jason "J" Brown – writing (as Jason Brown)
 Abz Love – writing (as Richard Breen)
 Sean Conlon – writing
 Filo – backing vocals
 Sharon Murphy – backing vocals
 Mista Dexter – turntable
 John Themis – guitar
 Steve Mac – keyboard, additional production and mix
 Chris Laws – drums, additional programming
 Adrian Bushby – recording, mixing
 Jake Davies – Pro Tools, mixing
 Conal Markey – mixing assistant
 Alvin Sweeney – mixing assistant
 Matt Howe – engineering
 Daniel Pursey – assistant engineering
 Form – artwork design
 Valerie Phillips – photograph

Charts

Weekly charts

Year-end charts

Certifications and sales

References

1999 singles
1999 songs
Bertelsmann Music Group singles
Five (band) songs
Number-one singles in Hungary
Number-one singles in Scotland
RCA Records singles
Songs written by Abz Love
Songs written by Jason "J" Brown
Songs written by Julian Gallagher
Songs written by Richard Stannard (songwriter)
Songs written by Sean Conlon
UK Singles Chart number-one singles